The 2013 Blancpain Endurance Series season was the third season of the Blancpain Endurance Series. The season commenced on 14 April at Monza and ended on 22 September at the Nürburgring. The season featured five rounds, with each race lasting for a duration of three hours besides the 24 Hours of Spa-Francorchamps and the 1000 km Nürburgring events.

Calendar
In July 2012, the Stéphane Ratel Organisation announced the 2013 calendar. The calendar did not differ much from the previous season. Only the event at Navarra was discontinued.

Entry list
On 8 April 2013, SRO released the provisional entry list for the first round at Monza.

Results and standings

Race results

Championship standings
Scoring system
Championship points were awarded for the first ten positions in each Championship Race. Entries were required to complete 75% of the winning car's race distance in order to be classified and earn points. Individual drivers were required to participate for a minimum of 25 minutes in order to earn championship points in any race. There were no points awarded for the Pole Position.

Championship Race points

1000 km Paul Ricard points

24 Hours of Spa points
Points were awarded after six hours, after twelve hours and at the finish.

Drivers' Championships

Pro Cup

Pro-Am Cup

Gentlemen Trophy

References

External links

2013 in European sport